Lindleya is a genus of Mexican evergreen trees of the family Rosaceae. The fruit are dry dehiscent capsules.

Taxonomic history

Lindleya, along with Vauquelinia and Kageneckia were formerly placed in family Quillajaceae.. It shares a base chromosome number of 17 with the pome-fruited members of tribe Maleae within the Rosaceae.

Notes

Maleae
Monotypic Rosaceae genera
Flora of Mexico